Kancheepuram is a newly formed Lok Sabha (Parliament of India) constituency after the 2008 delimitation. Its Tamil Nadu Parliamentary Constituency number is 6 of 39.

The constituency originally existed for the 1951 election.

This constituency is reserved for Scheduled Castes (SC) candidates.

Assembly segments 
The constituency in 2008 was formed of 6 assembly segments as follows:

Member of the Parliament

Election Results

General Election 2019

General Election 2014

General Election 2009

References

External links
Kancheepuram lok sabha  constituency election 2019 date and schedule

Lok Sabha constituencies in Tamil Nadu
Kanchipuram district
Chengalpattu district